Juniperus comitana is a species of conifer in the family Cupressaceae found in Guatemala and Mexico.

Sources

comitana
Trees of Chiapas
Flora of Guatemala
Trees of Guatemala
Plants described in 1944
Endangered biota of Mexico
Endangered flora of North America
Taxonomy articles created by Polbot